Belshazzar's Feast is a cantata by the English composer William Walton. It was first performed at the Leeds Festival on 8 October 1931, with the baritone Dennis Noble, the London Symphony Orchestra and the Leeds Festival Chorus, conducted by Malcolm Sargent. The work has remained one of Walton's most celebrated compositions. Osbert Sitwell selected the text from the Bible, primarily the Book of Daniel and Psalm 137. The work is dedicated to Walton's friend and benefactor Lord Berners.

Plot
In the story of Belshazzar's Feast, the Jews are in exile in Babylon. After a feast at which Belshazzar, the Babylonian king, commits sacrilege by using the Jews' sacred vessels to praise the heathen gods, he is miraculously killed, the kingdom falls, and the Jews regain their freedom.

List of movements
Although they are not specified in the published score, there is a clear delineation between sections, as follows:

 [Introduction] Thus spake Isaiah
 By the waters of Babylon/If I forget thee O Jerusalem
 [Transition] Babylon was a great city
 In Babylon, Belshazzar the King made a great feast
 Praise ye
 Thus in Babylon, the mighty city
 [Transition] And in that same hour
 Then sing aloud to God our strength
 The trumpeters and pipers were silent
 Then sing aloud to God our strength

Text 
Thus spake Isaiah –
Thy sons that thou shalt beget
They shall be taken away,
And be eunuchs
In the palace of the King of Babylon
Howl ye, howl ye, therefore:
For the day of the Lord is at hand!

By the waters of Babylon,
By the waters of Babylon
There we sat down: yea, we wept
And hanged our harps upon the willows.

For they that wasted us
Required of us mirth;
They that carried us away captive
Required of us a song.
Sing us one of the songs of Zion.

How shall we sing the Lord's song
In a strange land?

If I forget thee, O Jerusalem,
Let my right hand forget her cunning.
If I do not remember thee,
Let my tongue cleave to the roof of my mouth.
Yea, if I prefer not Jerusalem above my chief joy.

By the waters of Babylon
There we sat down: yea, we wept.

O daughter of Babylon, who art to be destroyed,
Happy shall he be that taketh thy children
And dasheth them against a stone,
For with violence shall that great city Babylon be thrown down
And shall be found no more at all.

Babylon was a great city,
Her merchandise was of gold and silver,
Of precious stones, of pearls, of fine linen,
Of purple, silk and scarlet,
All manner vessels of ivory,
All manner vessels of most precious wood,
Of brass, iron and marble,
Cinnamon, odours and ointments,
Of frankincense, wine and oil,
Fine flour, wheat and beasts,
Sheep, horses, chariots, slaves
And the souls of men.

In Babylon
Belshazzar the King
Made a great feast,
Made a feast to a thousand of his lords,
And drank wine before the thousand.

Belshazzar, whiles he tasted the wine,
Commanded us to bring the gold and silver vessels:
Yea! the golden vessels, which his father, Nebuchadnezzar,
Had taken out of the temple that was in Jerusalem.

He commanded us to bring the golden vessels
Of the temple of the house of God,
That the King, his Princes, his wives
And his concubines might drink therein.

Then the King commanded us:
Bring ye the cornet, flute, sackbut, psaltery
And all kinds of music: they drank wine again,
Yea, drank from the sacred vessels,
And then spake the King:

Praise ye
The God of Gold
Praise ye
The God of Silver
Praise ye
The God of Iron
Praise ye
The God of Wood
Praise ye
The God of Stone
Praise ye
The God of Brass
Praise ye the Gods!

Thus in Babylon, the mighty city,
Belshazzar the King made a great feast,
Made a feast to a thousand of his lords
And drank wine before the thousand.

Belshazzar whiles he tasted the wine
Commanded us to bring the gold and silver vessels
That his Princes, his wives and his concubines
Might rejoice and drink therein.

After they had praised their strange gods,
The idols and the devils,
False gods who can neither see nor hear,
Called they for the timbrel and the pleasant harp
To extol the glory of the King.
Then they pledged the King before the people,
Crying, Thou, O King, art King of Kings:
O King, live for ever...

And in that same hour, as they feasted
Came forth fingers of a man's hand
And the King saw
The part of the hand that wrote.

And this was the writing that was written:
'MENE, MENE, TEKEL UPHARSIN'
'THOU ART WEIGHED IN THE BALANCE
AND FOUND WANTING'.
In that night was Belshazzar the King slain
And his Kingdom divided.

Then sing aloud to God our strength:
Make a joyful noise unto the God of Jacob.
Take a psalm, bring hither the timbrel,
Blow up the trumpet in the new moon,
Blow up the trumpet in Zion
For Babylon the Great is fallen, fallen.
Alleluia!

Then sing aloud to God our strength:
Make a joyful noise unto the God of Jacob,
While the Kings of the Earth lament
And the merchants of the Earth
Weep, wail and rend their raiment.
They cry, Alas, Alas, that great city,
In one hour is her judgement come.

The trumpeters and pipers are silent,
And the harpers have ceased to harp,
And the light of a candle shall shine no more.

Then sing aloud to God our strength.
Make a joyful noise to the God of Jacob.
For Babylon the Great is fallen.
Alleluia!

Musical structure
The music throughout is strongly rhythmic and richly orchestrated. The rhythms and harmonies reflect Walton's interest in jazz and other popular music pressed into service to tell a religious story. Despite its jagged rhythms and strident orchestral effects, the work is essentially conventional in its tonality. Walton's biographer Michael Kennedy writes, "diatonicism is at the root of the matter ... string tremolandi, brass fanfares, and masterly use of unaccompanied declaration work their customary spell." Kennedy adds that the chilling orchestral sounds which introduce the writing on the wall derive from Richard Strauss's Salome.

Scoring
Baritone solo
Double mixed chorus (SSAATTBB); and Semi-chorus (SSAATTBB)
2 flutes, piccolo, 2 oboes, cor anglais (only if no saxophone), three clarinets in B-flat (second doubling clarinet in E-flat, third doubling bass clarinet in B-flat), alto saxophone in E-flat, 2 bassoons, contrabassoon; 4 horns in F, 3 trumpets, 2 tenor trombones, bass trombone, tuba; timpani, 3 or 4 percussionists (side drum, tenor drum, bass drum, triangle, tambourine, castanets, cymbals, gong, xylophone, glockenspiel, wood block, whip, anvil); 2 harps; piano (optional); organ; and strings.
Two brass bands, each consisting of: 3 trumpets, and optionally 2 tenor trombones, bass trombone, tuba.

Synopsis
The cantata is in ten distinct sections, played without pause. After a brief, recited introduction, the chorus and baritone sing of their homeland Zion, in an emotional setting of Psalm 137 (By the waters of Babylon, there we sat down: yea, we wept), and angrily express their bitterness toward their captors. The narrative then begins, and in a prolonged sequence we hear their horror, and then outrage, at the profanities of the king, followed by an exuberant march section depicting the king and his court praising their gods. The section is framed by a descending figure of four notes that, through repetition, passes down through the orchestra, immediately establishing a jazz influence with a flattened first note and marked syncopation.

This leads to an eerie, and economically orchestrated, depiction of the writing on the wall, and the death that night of Belshazzar (the story of Daniel interpreting the writing is omitted). The people celebrate their freedom, in a joyous song of praise interrupted by a lament over the fall of a great city (derived from Psalm 81 and the Book of Revelation).

The chorus represents the Jewish people throughout, although they adopt the tone of the Babylonians when telling the story of the feast. The baritone soloist has the role of narrator.

History and commentary
Walton struggled with the setting for several years, and it grew from its original conception as a short work for small forces, as commissioned by the BBC, to its eventual form. The invitation had come in a letter of 21 August 1929 from the BBC programme planner Edward Clark, who asked Walton for a work suitable for broadcasting, written for a small choir, soloist, and an orchestra not exceeding 15 players. Walton and Clark knew each other, as they had had dealings in relation to the premiere of the composer's Viola Concerto, which was premiered in the same year with Paul Hindemith as soloist. Walton dedicated the work to his friend and benefactor Lord Berners.

This was an age of gifted amateur choruses, and conductors and institutions dedicated to bringing forward new music, and the Leeds Festival took on the first performance. The baritone soloist was Dennis Noble, who recorded the work twice (including its premiere recording) and came to be particularly associated with it.

At first the work seemed avant-garde because of its extrovert writing and musical complexity; it is however always firmly tonal although it is scored without a key signature and with many accidentals. The addition of the brass bands was suggested by the festival director, the conductor Sir Thomas Beecham; the bands were on hand anyway for a performance of Berlioz’s Requiem, and Beecham said to the young Walton: "As you'll never hear the thing again, my boy, why not throw in a couple of brass bands?". Under the baton of Malcolm Sargent, an outstanding choral conductor, it was an immediate success, despite its severe challenges to the chorus. The work has remained one of Walton's most celebrated compositions.

The London premiere was conducted by Adrian Boult on 25 November 1931. The young Benjamin Britten was in the audience. The work was performed at the ISCM Festival in Amsterdam in 1933. Leopold Stokowski conducted two performances with the Philadelphia Orchestra in January 1934. Sargent regularly programmed it throughout the rest of his career, and took it as far afield as Australia, Brussels, Vienna and Boston. Not only British conductors from Sargent to Simon Rattle, but also Eugene Ormandy, Maurice Abravanel, André Previn, Robert Shaw, Leonard Slatkin and Andrew Litton have recorded the work. In 1947 Herbert von Karajan called it "the best choral music that's been written in the last 50 years". Karajan only ever performed the work once, in 1948 in Vienna, but it was a performance that moved Walton to tears and he expressed amazement that he could ever have written such a wonderful work.

On the other hand, the Synod of the Church of England considered its text inappropriate for performance in cathedrals, hence the Three Choirs Festival did not permit its performance until 1957.  The Worcester Music Festival barred it until 1975.

References

Sources

 

1931 compositions
Cultural depictions of Belshazzar
Compositions by William Walton
Cantatas
Works set in the 6th century BC